is a single-member electoral district of the House of Representatives, the lower house of the National Diet of Japan. The district covers two different parts of Kagoshima Prefecture. On the main island of Kyushu, it covers most of the Satsuma Peninsula; this includes the cities of Makurazaki, Ibusuki, Minamisatsuma, and Minamikyūshū, as well as the former municipalities Taniyama City and Kiire Town, which are now a part of the capital Kagoshima City. In 2021 the district had 337,660 eligible voters.

From 2000 to 2014, the district was represented by the Tokuda family, which runs the Tokushūkai hospital group. A political funds scandal in 2013 over donations from Tokushūkai led to the resignations of Tokyo governor Naoki Inose and Representative Takeshi Tokuda.  The Liberal Democratic Party (LDP) still managed to hold the district until 2021, when it was won by former Governor of Kagoshima Prefecture Satoshi Mitazono, who ran as an independent candidate.

List of representatives

Results

References 

Kagoshima Prefecture
Districts of the House of Representatives (Japan)